Kagurargus is a monotypic genus of Asian dwarf spiders containing the single species, Kagurargus kikuyai. It was first described by H. Ono in 2007, and has only been found in Japan.

See also
 List of Linyphiidae species (I–P)

References

Linyphiidae
Monotypic Araneomorphae genera
Spiders of Asia